John Ulysses Mobley (born October 10, 1973 in Chester, Pennsylvania) is a former American Football linebacker who played eight seasons for the Denver Broncos from 1996 through 2003 in the National Football League.

One of 9 children to parents who divorced when he was 13, Mobley lived with his father until age 16.  After his father suffered a stroke, Mobley moved in with his mother, who demanded he leave high school to help support his family.  Mobley spent a year living on the street in an old car before a friend's family took him in.  Lacking the academic credentials for a division I school, Mobley went on to play college football for Kutztown University in 1991.  Mobley made the starting lineup as a freshman and recorded nine tackles and a sack in his first college game.  He went on to earn an honorable mention on the All-American team as a sophomore Mobley's college career came to a sudden halt in 1993, when coach Barry Fetterman was fired as a result of an NCAA investigation into academic violations at the school.  The team's new coach, Al Leonzi, carried out his own investigation and ended up declaring Mobley ineligible for the upcoming season.

However, Mobley managed to get his academic affairs in order and returned for the 1994 and 1995 seasons, earning first-team AP Little All-American selections as a junior and senior, and earning a rare Division II invitation to the Senior Bowl in Mobile, Alabama.  He was drafted in the first round of the 1996 NFL Draft by the Denver Broncos, making him the highest drafted player in the history of the Pennsylvania State Athletic Conference, and just the third player from Kutztown ever to be drafted at all. Mobley's best season was in 1997 when he had 132 tackles and four sacks and was an All-Pro that season. Mobley missed most of the 1999 season because of an injury.

Mobley suffered a bruised spinal column during the 2003 season after he collided with his teammate Kelly Herndon in a game against the Baltimore Ravens, and the injury was severe enough that the Broncos cut him before the 2004 season in order to allow him time for recovery. He later re-signed with the Broncos and retired because of the injury.

Mobley served seven days in prison for a DUI conviction in 2004 after being pulled over and arrested on December 28, 2002. He was found guilty by a jury in April 2004 and was sentenced to 365 days behind bars, but the judge in the case later reduced it to seven days.

In Super Bowl XXXII, Mobley deflected a Brett Favre pass on 4th and 6 from the 31-yard-line with just over 30 seconds left in the game.  The deflection sealed a 31-24 victory for the Broncos and ended the NFC's run of 13 straight wins over the AFC in Super Bowl competition.

During his career, Mobley played in 105 career games, starting 102 of them, including two Super Bowls, during which he made 608 career tackles, 10.5 quarterback sacks, and five interceptions for 45 yards and a touchdown.

He is the cousin of former NBA player Cuttino Mobley.

References

External links
http://sports.espn.go.com/nfl/players/profile?statsId=3604
http://sportsillustrated.cnn.com/football/nfl/players/3604/

1973 births
Living people
People from Delaware County, Pennsylvania
Sportspeople from Chester, Pennsylvania
Players of American football from Pennsylvania
American football linebackers
Kutztown Golden Bears football players
Denver Broncos players
Ed Block Courage Award recipients